Villasandino is a municipality and town located in the province of Burgos, Castile and León, Spain. According to the 2004 census (INE), the municipality has a population of 240 inhabitants.

People from Villasandino
Diego Osorio Villegas (1540–1601): Soldier and Governor of Venezuela Province (1589–1597)

References

Municipalities in the Province of Burgos